The D'Assas class comprised three protected cruisers of the French Navy built in the early 1890s; the ships were , , and . They were ordered as part of a naval construction program directed at France's rivals, Italy and Germany, particularly after Italy made progress in modernizing its own fleet. The plan was also intended to remedy a deficiency in cruisers that had been revealed during training exercises in the 1880s. As such, the D'Assas-class cruisers were intended to operate as fleet scouts and in the French colonial empire. A fourth ship, designated "G3" in the 1894 budget, was authorized but was canceled the following year.

All three ships began service in the Mediterranean Squadron in the late 1890s, though D'Assas was later transferred to the Northern Squadron in 1901 and then to French Indochina in 1904. Du Chayla supported an amphibious landing in French Morocco in 1907 and Cassard joined her there the following year. D'Assas was discarded in 1914, but the other two members of the class saw service during World War I, primarily patrolling the Atlantic for German commerce raiders. Both ships were partially disarmed late in the conflict and Cassard became a gunnery training ship while Du Chayla remained in active service. She took part in the Allied intervention in the Russian Civil War in 1919 before being sold to ship breakers in 1920, while Cassard lingered on in service until 1924, when she, too, was sold for scrap.

Background

These developments provoked a strong response in the French press. The Budget Committee in the French Chamber of Deputies began to press for a "two-power standard" in 1888, which would see the French fleet enlarged to equal the combined Italian and German fleets, then France's two main rivals on the continent. This initially came to nothing, as the supporters of the  doctrine called for a fleet largely based on squadrons of torpedo boats to defend the French coasts rather than an expensive fleet of ironclads. This view had significant support in the Chamber of Deputies.

The next year, a war scare with Italy led to further outcry to strengthen the fleet. To compound matters, the visit of a German squadron of four ironclads to Italy confirmed French concerns of a combined Italo-German fleet that would dramatically outnumber their own. Training exercises held in France that year demonstrated that the slower French fleet would be unable to prevent the faster Italian squadron from bombarding the French coast at will, in part because it lacked enough cruisers (and doctrine to use them) to scout for the enemy ships.

To correct the weaknesses of the French fleet, on 22 November 1890, the Superior Council authorized a new construction program directed not at simple parity with the Italian and German fleets, but numerical superiority. In addition to twenty-four new battleships, a total of seventy cruisers were to be built for use in home waters and overseas in the French colonial empire. The D'Assas class were ordered to as part of the program, and were very similar to the earlier s.

Design
The design for the D'Assas class was prepared by Delphin Albert Lhomme, who based in on the earlier Friant class. The longer hull also permitted slightly finer hull lines, and thus greater hydrodynamic efficiency; while the ships of the D'Assas class were faster than those of the Friant type, they still failed to match the top speed of the progenitor of their design lineage, . The larger hull also provided for better ammunition feeding from the magazines to the amidships guns.

General characteristics and machinery

D'Assas suffered from stability problems and reportedly sat lower in the water than her sister ships.

The ships' hulls featured a pronounced ram bow and a tumblehome shape, which were common characteristics of major French warships of the period. The ram bow was not reinforced to permit it to actually be used to ram enemy vessels. They had a flush deck with a sloped stern. Their superstructure consisted of a main conning tower with a bridge forward and a smaller, secondary conning tower aft. The ships were fitted with a pair of pole masts with spotting tops for observation and signaling purposes. The masts each held a searchlight, and another pair of lights were placed in the hull forward, and two more were placed toward the stern. Their crew varied over the course of their careers and ranged from 370 to 392 officers and enlisted men.

The ships' propulsion system consisted of a pair of 4-cylinder vertical triple-expansion steam engines driving two screw propellers for D'Assas and Cassard, while Du Chayla received 3-cylinder engines. Steam was provided by twenty coal-burning Lagrafel d'Allest water-tube boilers that were ducted into three funnels on the centerline amidships.

Armament and armor

The ships were armed with a main battery of six  Modèle 1893 45-caliber guns, except Du Chayla, which received six earlier M1887 pattern guns of the same bore diameter. They were placed in individual pivot mounts; one was on the forecastle, two were in sponsons abreast the forward conning tower, another pair was in sponsons further aft, and the last gun was on the stern. The guns fired a variety of shells, including solid cast iron projectiles, and explosive armor-piercing (AP) and semi-armor-piercing shells. These were supported by a secondary battery of four  Modèle 1891 guns, which were carried in pivot mounts in the conning towers, one on each side per tower.

For close-range defense against torpedo boats, they carried ten  M1885 3-pounder Hotchkiss guns, two  M1885 1-pounder guns, and three 37 mm Hotchkiss revolver cannon, all in individual mounts.

Above the deck at the sides, a cofferdam filled with cellulose was intended to contain flooding from damage below the waterline. The main and secondary guns were fitted with  gun shields.

Modifications
The ships underwent a series of changes to their armament over the course of their careers. In 1898, around the time Cassard and Du Chayla were placed in full commission, the light armament was revised to six 47 mm guns, and a third 37 mm QF gun was added and by 1902, the Hotchkiss revolvers were removed from both vessels. For D'Assas, another three 37 mm guns had been added in 1901, but she retained her revolver cannon until 1906. That year, Cassard lost her torpedo tubes, and Du Chayla had hers removed in 1908.

Cassard and Du Chayla both lost much of their weaponry during World War I so the guns could be used in other vessels or ashore by the French Army. By 1917, Cassards armament had been reduced to just two of her 164.7 mm guns. The following year, she had four  M1877 guns added. Also in 1918, Du Chayla had her armament reduced to two 164.7 mm guns, four  M1897 guns in her sponsons, and four 47 mm guns. In 1919, two of Du Chaylas 47 mm guns were transferred to Cassard. Cassard was rearmed a final time after the war in 1921, by which time she was serving as a gunnery training ships. For that purpose, she was fitted with a variety of guns, including one 164.7 mm gun aft, one  gun in the bow position, two 90 mm guns in the forward pair of sponsons, two 75 mm guns in the aft sponsons, and two 47 mm guns.

Construction

Service history

D'Assas and Cassard initially served with the Mediterranean Squadron after entering service in 1898, and they were joined by Du Chayla the following year. In 1901, D'Assas had been transferred to the Northern Squadron, based in the English Channel. During this period, they were occupied with routine peacetime training exercises with the rest of the main French fleets in home waters. D'Assas was deployed to the cruiser squadron based in French Indochina in East Asia, and in 1905, she assisted with the unsuccessful attempt to re-float the armored cruiser  after it ran aground. By that time, Cassard had been reduced to reserve.

In August 1907, Du Chayla supported an amphibious assault in French Morocco during the Bombardment of Casablanca. Cassard was reactivated in 1908 for a deployment to French Morocco. D'Assas returned home that year to be converted into a fast minelayer, along with Cassard, but the project was deemed to be too expensive, and D'Assas was instead placed in reserve  and briefly used as a storage hulk for waste oil from 1910 to 1913. D'Assas was struck from the naval register in 1914; she was then sold to ship breakers.

At the start of World War I in August 1914, Cassard initially operated out of Morocco, patrolling for German U-boats. Du Chayla was also assigned to patrol duty in the Atlantic, but she, too, saw no action. In September, Cassard bombarded local villages in Morocco to suppress challenges to French colonial rule. The ship was later transferred to the western Mediterranean and Red Seas, along with a deployment to the Indian Ocean in 1917. By 1918, Du Chayla had been partially disarmed to supply weapons to the French Army. She took part in the Allied intervention in the Russian Civil War in 1919 but was recalled to France in 1920, where she was struck from the naval register in 1921 and sold to ship breakers. In the meantime, Cassard was partially disarmed after World War I and was converted into a gunnery training ship, though she was struck from the register in 1924 and sold for scrap.

Footnotes

Notes

Citations

References

 
 
 
 
 
 
 
 
 
 
 
 
 
 
 
 
 

 
Cruiser classes
Ships built in France
World War I cruisers of France
Ship classes of the French Navy